Qasrik may refer to:
 Qasrik, Salmas
 Qasrik-e Olya, Salmas County
 Qasrik-e Sofla, Salmas County
 Qasrik, Urmia
 Qasrik, Beradust, Urmia County
 Qasrik, Silvaneh, Urmia County
 Qasrik, Sumay-ye Jonubi, Urmia County